The Pale (Irish: An Pháil) or the English Pale ( or ) was the part of Ireland directly under the control of the English government in the Late Middle Ages.  It had been reduced by the late 15th century to an area along the east coast stretching from Dalkey, south of Dublin, to the garrison town of Dundalk. The inland boundary went to Naas and Leixlip around the Earldom of Kildare, towards Trim and north towards Kells. In this district, many townlands have English or French names, the latter associated with Norman influence in England.

Etymology
The word pale, meaning a fence, is derived from the Latin word , meaning "stake", specifically a stake used to support a fence. A paling fence is made of pales ganged side by side, and the word palisade is derived from the same root. From this came the figurative meaning of "boundary". The Oxford English Dictionary is dubious about the popular notion that the phrase beyond the pale, as something outside the boundary — i.e., uncivilised, derives from this specific Irish meaning. Also derived from the "boundary" concept was the idea of a pale as an area within which local laws were valid. The term was used not only for the Pale in Ireland but also for various other English overseas settlements, notably English Calais. The term was also used to refer to specific regions in other nations: the term Pale of Settlement was applied to the area in the west of Imperial Russia where Jews were permitted to reside.

History
The Pale was a strip of land, centred on Dublin, that stretched from Dundalk in Louth to Dalkey in Dublin; it became the base of English rule in Ireland. The Norman invasion of Ireland, beginning in 1169, created the Lordship of Ireland and brought Ireland under the theoretical control of the Plantagenet Kings of England. From the 13th century onwards the Hiberno-Norman occupation in Ireland at first, faltered, then waned. Across most of Ireland, the Normans increasingly assimilated into Irish culture after 1300. They made alliances with neighbouring autonomous Gaelic lords. In the long periods when there was no large royal army in Ireland, the Norman lords, like their Gaelic neighbours in the provinces, acted essentially as independent rulers in their own areas.

The Lordship controlled by the English king shrank accordingly, and as parts of its perimeter in counties Meath and Kildare were fenced or ditched, it became known as the Pale, deriving from the Latin word palus, a stake, or, synecdochically, a fence. Parts can still be seen west of Clane on the grounds of what is now Clongowes Wood College. The military power of the crown itself was greatly weakened by the Hundred Years War (1337–1453), and the Wars of the Roses (1455–85). The Parliament of Ireland was created, often sitting at Drogheda until the Tudors took a greater interest in Irish affairs from 1485 and moved it back to Dublin. The Pale generally consisted of fertile lowlands which were easier for the garrison to defend from ambush than hilly or wooded ground. For reasons of trade and administration, a version of English became the official language. Its closest modern derivative is said to be the accent used by natives of Fingal.

In 1366, so that the English Crown could assert its authority over the settlers, a parliament was assembled in Kilkenny and the Statute of Kilkenny was enacted. The statute decreed that intermarriage between English settlers and Irish natives was forbidden. It also forbade the settlers from using the Irish language and adopting Irish modes of dress or other customs, as such practices were already common. The adoption of Gaelic Brehon property law, in particular, undermined the feudal nature of the Lordship. The Act was never implemented successfully, even in the Pale itself. This inability to enforce the statute indicated that Ireland was withdrawing from English cultural norms.

By the Tudor period, the Irish culture and language had reestablished itself in regions conquered by the Anglo-Normans: "even in the Pale, all the common folk ... for the most part are of Irish birth, Irish habit and of Irish language". At a higher social level, there was extensive intermarriage between the Gaelic Irish aristocracy and Anglo-Norman lords, beginning not long after the invasion.

By the late 15th century, the Pale became the only part of Ireland that remained subject to the English king, with most of the island paying only token recognition of the overlordship of the English crown. The tax base shrank to a fraction of what it had been in 1300. A proverb quoted by Sir John Davies said that "whoso lives by west of the Barrow, lives west of the law."  The earls of Kildare ruled as Lords Deputy from 1470 (with more or less success), aided by alliances with the Gaelic lords. This lasted until the 1520s, when the earls passed out of royal favour, but the 9th earl was reinstated in the 1530s. The brief revolt by his son "Silken Thomas" in 1534–35 served in the following decades to hasten the Tudor conquest of Ireland, in which Dublin and the surviving Pale were used as the crown's main military base.  A book A Perambulation of Leinster, Meath, and Louth, of which consist the English Pale (1596) expressed contemporary usage.

The pale was composed of Dublin and its surrounding area, the population of which was mainly made of Old English merchants who were loyal to the crown.

Fortification: The Pale Ditch

The Pale boundary essentially consisted of a fortified ditch and rampart built around parts of the medieval counties of Louth, Meath, Dublin and Kildare, leaving out half of Meath, most of Kildare, and southwest County Dublin. Border or garrison towns of the pale included Ardee, Siddan, Kells, Athboy, Trim, Kilcock, Clane, Naas, Harristown, Ballymore Eustace, Rathmore, Kilteel, Saggart, Tallaght and Dalkey. The northern frontier of the Pale was marked by the De Verdon fortress of Castle Roche, while the southern border lay slightly south of the present day M50 motorway in Dublin, which crosses the site of what was Carrickmines Castle. The following description is from The Parish of Taney: A History of Dundrum, near Dublin, and Its Neighbourhood (1895):

In the period immediately after the Norman Settlement was constructed the barrier, known as the "Pale," separating the lands occupied by the settlers from those remaining in the hands of the Irish. This barrier consisted of a ditch, raised some ten or twelve feet from the ground, with a hedge of thorn on the outer side. It was constructed, not so much to keep out the Irish, as to form an obstacle in their way in their raids on the cattle of the settlers, and thus give time for a rescue. The Pale began at Dalkey, and followed a southwesterly direction towards Kilternan; then turning northwards passed Kilgobbin, where a castle still stands, and crossed the Parish of Taney to the south of that part of the lands of Balally now called Moreen, and thence in a westerly direction to Tallaght, and on to Naas in the County of Kildare. In the wall bounding Moreen is still to be seen a small watch-tower and the remains of a guard-house adjoining it. From this point a beacon-fire would raise the alarm as far as Tallaght, where an important castle stood. A portion of the Pale is still to be seen in Kildare between Clane and Clongowes Wood College at Sallins.

Within the confines of the Pale, the leading gentry and merchants lived lives not too different from those of their counterparts in England, save for the constant fear of attack from the Gaelic Irish.

Portions of the Pale Ditch can still be seen in the Sandyford/Kilgobbin/Ballyogan areas of South Dublin. The most well preserved section can be visited and lies just south of the Ballyogan Road within the Ballyogan Recycling Park. It consists of pair of ditches on either side of a high flat-topped bank. The bank is 2 to 3 meters wide on the top and is approximately 2 meters above the bottom of the ditches. The entire length of this section is roughly 500 meters and the top of the bank is planted with hedgerow shrubs, indicating that the Pale Ditch subsequently served as a field boundary. Another section of the Pale Ditch lies in the Clay Farm Ecopark, near the Ballyogan Road. This section is very different from the previous section, in that it doesn't consist of a double ditch and bank. Rather, the builders made use of an existing shallow escarpment, steepening the slope to create a 2 meter high barrier to movement from north to south. The purpose of this was probably to make it hard for Irish raiders to herd stolen cattle from the Pale to the Wicklow mountains to the south. That this feature was part of the Pale Ditch was originally proposed by Rob Goodbody in the 1990s, and recently confirmed by archaeology during the building of the Clay Farm housing development. Both the sections described above are part of a single linear earthwork, designed to connect Kilgobbin and Carrickmines castles, fortifications built by the Walsh Family during the medieval period to defend the southern marches of the Pale. Another, slightly less well-preserved section of the Pale Ditch can be seen at Kilcross Crescent within the Kilcross housing estate near Sandyford village. This section consists of a bank approximately 200 meters long, although the associated ditches are no longer clearly visible.

End
The idea of the Pale was inseparable from the notion of a separate Anglo-Irish polity and culture. After the 17th century and especially after the Anglican Reformation and the Plantation of Ulster, the "Old English" settlers were gradually assimilated into the Irish population. This was in large part due to their relative reluctance to give up Roman Catholicism (those who worshipped in the Church of Ireland were rewarded with a higher status). They kept their version of the English language, though by that time many of them also spoke Irish. Several of these men were notable contributors to literature in Irish, including Pierce Ferriter and Geoffrey Keating. Christopher Nugent, 6th Baron Delvin, wrote an Irish-language primer for Elizabeth I.

Modern usage
The term continues to be used in contemporary Irish speech to refer to County Dublin and nearby counties, generally critically—for example, a government department may be criticised for concentrating its resources on the Pale.

See also
 Kingdom of Dublin
 Greater Dublin Area
 History of Ireland
 Pale of Settlement in Imperial Russia

References

External links
A map of the Pale (late 15th century)
Origin of the word 'pale'
World Wide Words: Beyond the pale

History of County Dublin
History of County Meath
Lordship of Ireland
Settlement schemes